Poly(A) binding protein interacting protein 2B is a protein that in humans is encoded by the PAIP2B gene.

Function

Most mRNAs, except for histones, contain a 3-prime poly(A) tail. Poly(A)-binding protein (PABP; see MIM 604679) enhances translation by circularizing mRNA through its interaction with the translation initiation factor EIF4G1 (MIM 600495) and the poly(A) tail. Various PABP-binding proteins regulate PABP activity, including PAIP1 (MIM 605184), a translational stimulator, and PAIP2A (MIM 605604) and PAIP2B, translational inhibitors (Derry et al., 2006 [PubMed 17381337]).[supplied by OMIM, Mar 2008].

References

Further reading